Chivalry is the traditional code of conduct associated with the medieval institution of knighthood.

Chivalry may also refer to:

Games 
 Chivalry (board game), a strategy board game
 Chivalry (1983 video game), a 1983 video game
 Chivalry: Medieval Warfare, a 2012 video game
 Chivalry 2, the 2021 video game sequel

Other uses 
 , a British freighter
"Chivalry", a short story by Neil Gaiman
 Chivalry (TV series), a British TV series
Chivalry of a Failed Knight, A 2013 Light Novel Series

See also
 Cavalry, soldiers or warriors who fight mounted on horseback